() is a textual work written in Classical Tibetan and one of the Seven Treasuries of Longchenpa. Longchenpa wrote 'The Treasury of the Supreme Vehicle' as an autocommentary to this work. 

Tsigdön Dzö is a collection of teachings and practices. The text is believed to have originated in India and was later transmitted to Tibet, where it became part of the treasure tradition of revealed teachings (terma) in the Nyingma school of Tibetan Buddhism. The teachings in the Tsigdön Dzö are believed to be powerful and efficacious in bringing wealth and prosperity to those who practice them correctly.

Title
The full name for the work is 'The Treasury of Precious Words and Meanings'.

Outline of text
Rigpa Shedra (August 2009) provide a useful outline of the text which in its original composition consists of eleven chapters from which the following summary is founded:
 the 'ground and basis of reality' (Wylie: gzhi) and how that 'ground' dynamically manifests itself; 
 how sentient beings stray from the 'ground'; 
 how all sentient beings have the essence of enlightened energy; 
 how 'primordial wisdom' abides within us; 
 the pathways;
 the gateways;
 domain for 'primordial wisdom'; 
 how primordial wisdom is experientially accessed; 
 signs of realization;
 signs in the dying and bardo transition; and 
 ultimate fruition as the manifest realization of the kayas.

English Translations
 Precious Treasury of Genuine Meaning. Translated by Light of Berotsana. Snow Lion 2015, revised 2020.

Western scholarship
Tulku Thondup Rinpoche (1989) broached an opening of the discourse of this text into English when he included an abridged translation of Chapter Eleven in one of his works.

Notes

External links
 Rigpa Shedra (August 2009). 'Treasury of Word and Meaning'. Source:  (accessed: Friday December 18, 2009)
 Yoniversum page on The Seven Treasuries

Nyingma texts